Dolonci or Dolonki is the name of a Thracian tribe in Thracian Chersonese. They are mentioned by Herodotus.

References

See also
List of Thracian tribes

Ancient tribes in Thrace
Ancient tribes in the Balkans
Thracian tribes